The 2009–10 Cupa României was the seventy-second season of the annual Romanian football knockout tournament. It began on 15 July 2009 with the matches of Phase 1 and ended with the Final on 6 June 2010. CFR Cluj were the defending champions.

The winners of the competition qualified for the play-off round of the 2010–11 Europa League.

Round of 32

The 14 winners of Phase V entered in this round and were joined by 18 teams from the 2009–10 Liga I season. The matches were played on 22–24 September 2009. frf.ro reference

|}

Round of 16
The 16 winners from the previous round competed in this round. The matches were played on 27, 28 and 29 October 2009. frf.ro reference

|}

Quarter-finals
Eight winners from the previous round competed in this round. The matches were played on 17, 18 and 19 November 2009 in a one leg tie. http://www.frfotbal.ro/index.php?competition_id=8&season=46&serie_id=285&etapa_id=2709

Semi-finals
The semifinals were played in two legs. The first leg was played on 24 and 25 March 2010 while the second leg on 14 and 15 April 2010. http://www.frfotbal.ro/index.php?competition_id=8&season=46&serie_id=285&etapa_id=3224

|}

First leg

Second leg

Final

External links
Cupa Romaniei – Sezon 2009-2010 (FRF)

2009–10 in Romanian football
2009–10 domestic association football cups
2009-10